Alexia Marie Gabrielle Latortue is an American development official who is currently serving as the assistant secretary of the treasury for international markets in the Biden administration.

Early life and education 
Latortue was raised in Puerto Rico, West Africa, and Austria. Her father, Gérard Latortue, served as the prime minister of Haiti from 2004 to 2006 after the 2004 Haitian coup d'état. She earned a Bachelor of Science degree from Georgetown University and a Master of Arts from the Fletcher School at Tufts University.

Career 
From 1997 to 2002, Latortue served as a development specialist for Development Alternatives Incorporated. From 2003 to 2013, she was the deputy CEO of the Consultative Group to Assist the Poor. In 2013, she joined the United States Department of the Treasury, serving as principal deputy assistant secretary for international development policy. From 2017 to 2021, she served as the managing director for corporate strategy at the European Bank for Reconstruction and Development. She has served as deputy CEO of the Millennium Challenge Corporation since March 2021.

Biden administration
On August 6, 2021, President Joe Biden nominated Latortue to be an assistant secretary of the treasury for international markets within the United States Department of the Treasury. The Senate Banking Committee held hearings on her nomination on September 21, 2021. Latortue was favorably reported out of the committee on October 5, 2021. The entire Senate confirmed Latortue's nomination by voice vote on December 18, 2021.

See also
Department of the Treasury appointments by Joe Biden

References 

Living people
Georgetown University alumni
The Fletcher School at Tufts University alumni
Economic development in the United States
United States Department of the Treasury officials
Biden administration personnel
Year of birth missing (living people)